The Rocky Mountain Intercollegiate Ski Association (RMISA) is a National Collegiate Athletic Association (NCAA) skiing-only conference.  As the NCAA does not have divisions in collegiate skiing, it is composed of both NCAA Division I and NCAA Division II schools.  The RMISA was founded in 1950 and was largely responsible for the creation of skiing as an NCAA sport in 1954.  From 1950 to 1976 it was men's skiing, from 1977 to 1982 the RMISA sponsored both men's and women's skiing separately.  In 1983, the NCAA incorporated women's skiing (it was an AIAW sport from 1977 to 1982) and made it a Coed sport and the RMISA did the same.

The RMISA has won 56 of 68 skiing national championships since 1950, including 53 of 63 NCAA Championships that have been awarded and 29 of the 34 NCAA Championships since skiing went coed in 1983.  Denver, Colorado and Utah are first, second and third on the list for most skiing national championships.  Denver has won 25, including 23 NCAA, while Colorado has 20 (19 NCAA) and Utah 11 (10 NCAA).

Current members
The RMISA is currently made up of nine members, seven with NCAA affiliated ski teams and four associate members.  The associate members can compete in regular season competition and at the RMISA Championships but cannot qualify for the NCAA Skiing Championships.

Full Members:
Alaska Anchorage Seawolves
Alaska Nanooks — Joined in 2016–17
California Golden Bears
Colorado Buffaloes
Denver Pioneers
Montana State Bobcats
Utah Utes
Westminster College (Utah)

Associate Members:
Colorado Mountain College
Wyoming Cowboys and Cowgirls

Former members
Boise State Broncos, dropped varsity skiing in 2007
Colorado College Tigers, charter member in 1950, unclear when dropped
Colorado Mines Orediggers, charter member in 1950, unclear when dropped
Colorado State Rams, charter member in 1950, unclear when dropped
Nevada Wolf Pack, dropped varsity skiing in 2011
New Mexico Lobos, dropped varsity skiing in 2019
Utah State Aggies, charter member in 1950, unclear when dropped
Western State Colorado Mountaineers, dropped varsity skiing in 2008
Whitman College, dropped varsity skiing in 2008
Wyoming Cowboys and Cowgirls, dropped varsity skiing in 1992 (Wyoming's current RMISA team is its club skiing team)

RMISA Champions

Source:

Championships By School
Overall
Colorado 27 (1959-60-62-63-69-72-73-74-75-76-79 Men; 1978-79 Women; 1986-91-93-94-95-99-2000-02-06-08-10-11-13-15 Coed)
Denver 18 (1950-51-52-54-55-56-57-58-61-65-66-67-70-71 Men; 2001-04-05-07 Coed)
Utah 17 (1977-81 Women; 1980-81-82 Men; 1984-85-87-88-89-90-96-97-98-2003-12-14-16 Coed)
Wyoming 6 (1968-77-78 Men; 1980-82 Women; 1983 Coed)
New Mexico 2 (1992-2009 Coed)
Western State 2 (1953-64 Men)
Men's
Denver 14 (1950-51-52-54-55-56-57-58-61-65-66-67-70-71)
Colorado 11 (1959-60-62-63-69-72-73-74-75-76-79)
Utah 3 (1980-81-82)
Wyoming 3 (1968-77-78)
Western State 2 (1953-64)
Women's
Colorado 2 (1978-79)
Utah 2 (1977-81)
Wyoming 2 (1980-82)
Coed
Colorado 14 (1986-91-93-94-95-99-2000-02-06-08-10-11-13-15)
Utah 13 (1984-85-87-88-89-90-96-97-98-2003-12-14-16)
Denver 4 (2001-04-05-07)
New Mexico 2 (1992-2009)
Wyoming 1 (1983)

References

External links
 

NCAA conferences
College skiing conferences in the United States